Mackinac County Airport  is a county-owned public-use airport in Mackinac County, Michigan, United States. It is the closest airport to Mackinac Island Airport with a refueling station, and is a major stopover destination for flights to and from Mackinac Island that require refueling. The airport is included in the Federal Aviation Administration (FAA) National Plan of Integrated Airport Systems for 2017–2021, in which it is categorized as a local general aviation facility.

The airport received $30,000 from the U.S. Department of Transportation in 2020 as part of the CARES Act to help mitigate the effects of the covid-19 pandemic.

Facilities and aircraft 

For the 12-month period ending December 31, 2015, the airport had 33,050 aircraft operations, an average of 90 per day: 55% general aviation, 45% air taxi and less than 1% military. In March 2017, there were 16 aircraft based at this airport: 13 single-engine and 3 multi-engine.

Incidents and accidents 
 On August 2, 1994, a Grumman HU-16 seaplane originating from Mackinac County Airport registered as N7025N collided with a moored boat in the north cove of St. Helena Island, near St. Ignace, Michigan. The pilot and boat operator had prearranged to meet in the cove. The airplane received minor damage, and the pilot, co-pilot, and seven airplane passengers reported no injuries. Two adults and a four-year-old child received minor injuries immediately prior to the collision when they were abandoning the boat. Another child remaining on the boat was fatally injured.
 On July 13, 2010, a privately owned Beechcraft Baron 58, registered as N3081N, en route from Mackinac Island Airport to Chicago Executive Airport crashed shortly after takeoff from Mackinac County Airport where it had stopped to refuel. Four Israeli-American citizens were killed, and another was seriously injured.
 On December 3, 2011, a Great Lakes Air Piper Cherokee Six registered as N33315 en route from Mackinac County Airport crashed upon approach to Mackinac Island Airport. The pilot and sole passenger died upon impact. The Coast Guard commenced a search and rescue operation to recover the down aircraft, locating it in a wooded area approximately 1.6 miles north of runway 83D. The victims were Tom Phillips of Kirkland, Washington, an Amazon Executive, and pilot Joseph Phillips, Jr. of St. Ignace. The pilot's error to properly judge weather conditions was named as the cause of the crash.

References

External links 
 Airport page at Mackinac County website
  at Michigan DOT Airport Directory
 Great Lakes Air, the fixed-base operator (FBO)
 Aerial image as of April 1998 from USGS The National Map
 

Airports in Michigan
Transportation in Mackinac County, Michigan
Buildings and structures in Mackinac County, Michigan
Airports in the Upper Peninsula of Michigan